Phosphoenolpyruvate carboxykinase 2, mitochondrial (PCK2, PEPCK-M), is an isozyme of phosphoenolpyruvate carboxykinase (PCK, PEPCK) that in humans is encoded by the PCK2 gene on chromosome 14. This gene encodes a mitochondrial enzyme that catalyzes the conversion of oxaloacetate (OAA) to phosphoenolpyruvate (PEP) in the presence of guanosine triphosphate (GTP). A cytosolic form of this protein is encoded by a different gene and is the key enzyme of gluconeogenesis in the liver. Alternatively spliced transcript variants have been described.[provided by RefSeq, Apr 2014]

Structure
The PCK2 gene encodes the mitochondrial form of PCK and shares a 68% homology in DNA sequence with PCK1 and 70% homology in amino acid sequence with its encoded cytosolic form, PCK1. Moreover, PCK2 shares structural homology with PCK1, indicating that the genes originated from a common ancestor gene. Nonetheless, though both genes possess ten exons and nine introns, the sizes of their introns may differ by ~2 kb, with the largest intron in PCK2 spanning 2.5 kb. Altogether, the total length of the PCK2 gene spans ~10 kb. Another difference is the presence of Alu sequences in its introns that are absent in PCK1. PCK2 also contains an 18-residue mitochondrial targeting sequence at its N-terminal. Potential regulatory elements, including five GC boxes and three CCAAT boxes, lie 1819 bp upstream of the transcription start site. In addition, the proximal promoter region of PCK2 contains two putative ATF/CRE sequences which bind ATF4.

Function 
As a PCK, PCK2 catalyzes the GTP-driven conversion of OAA to PEP as a rate-limiting step in gluconeogenesis. This conversion step serves as a bridge between glycolytic and TCA cycle intermediates in the mitochondria. In pancreatic β-cells, PCK2 regulates glucose-stimulated insulin secretion by recycling GTP generated from the succinyl-CoA synthase reaction. This drives the TCA cycle, converting PEP to pyruvate to acetyl-CoA for the citrate synthase reaction. Since nearly all of the glycolytic reactions upstream of PEP and downstream of glucose-6-phosphate (G6P) are reversible, PCK2-mediated synthesis of PEP could fuel multiple biosynthetic processes, such as serine synthesis, glycerol synthesis, and nucleotide synthesis. Notably, PCK2 preferentially converts OAA derived from lactate and, thus, can promote biosynthesis even under low-glucose conditions. As a result, PCK2 activity contributes to cell growth and survival during stress.

While PCK1 is mainly expressed in the liver and kidney, PCK2 is ubiquitously expressed in various cell types, including leukocytes and neurons, as well as in non-gluconeogenic tissues, including pancreas, brain, heart. Moreover, while PCK1 expression is regulated by hormones or nutrients involved in gluconeogenesis, PCK2 is constitutively expressed. These differences indicate that PCK2 may also perform non-gluconeogenic functions.

Clinical Significance

PCK2 is associated with several cancers, including lung cancer, and promotes tumorigenesis through its gluconeogenic function. In low-glucose settings, stress to the endoplasmic reticulum upregulates ATF4, which then upregulates PCK2. As PCK2 allows cells to utilize alternative cataplerotic pathways to convert TCA cycle intermediates to glycolytic intermediates, PCK2 activity can enhance the survival tumor cells facing reduced glucose levels.

Due to the gluconeogenic function of PCK2, PCK2 deficiency is expected to disrupt glucose homeostasis and result in hypoglycemia. However, though two cases have been documented, a subsequent study suggested that PCK2 deficiency may not have been the primary cause.

Interactive pathway map

See also 
Phosphoenolpyruvate carboxykinase
PCK1

References 

Enzymes
Genes on human chromosome 14